Brasilomma is a monotypic genus of Brazilian long-spinneret ground spiders containing the single species, Brasilomma enigmatica. It was first described by Antônio Domingos Brescovit in 2012, and is only found in Brazil.

See also
 List of Prodidominae species

References

Prodidominae
Monotypic Araneomorphae genera
Spiders of Brazil